Catherine Easton Renfrew,  (died 2002) was a British speech therapist.

Career
Renfrew was Chief Speech Therapist for United Oxford Hospitals.

During her career Renfrew pioneered three forms of expressive language assessments: The Renfrew Action Picture Test (RAPT), in which a child describes a picture with a single sentence, assesses the length and complexity of spoken sentence structure in 3–8 year olds; the Renfrew Bus Story involves story re-telling to assess oral and narrative skills in 3–8 year olds; and Renfrew word finding assesses word finding abilities through the naming of pictures and the recording of errors in 3–9 year olds.

Awards
Renfrew was elected a Fellow of the Royal College of Speech and Language Therapists in 1950. She was awarded the Honours of the RCSLT in 1982. Following her death, the RCSLT instituted a biennial award in her memory. The Catherine Renfrew Memorial Award encourages international collaboration and attendance at non-UK conferences and events through an award of £500.

She was awarded a MBE in the 1974 Birthday Honours.

Selected publications
Renfrew, C. E. and Mitchell, P. 2015 (4th edition). Bus story test : a test of narrative speech. UK, Speechmark Publishing.
Renfrew, C. E. 1997. Renfrew language scales / Action picture test. Bicester, Oxon, Speechmark.
Renfrew, C. E. 1976. "Screening for Language Disorders in Preschool Children", Developmental Medicine and Chid Neurology 18(1). 97–98. 
Renfrew, C. E. 1972. "Prediction of Persisting Speech Defect", International Journal of Language and Communication Disorders 8(1). 37–41. 
Renfrew, C. E. 1972. Speech disorders in children. Oxford, Pergamon Press.
Renfrew, C. 1968. The child who does not talk : report of an International Study Group, St. Mary's College, Durham, 1963 on The Development and the Disorders of Hearing, Language and Speech in Children. London, Spastics International Medical Publications.
Renfrew, C. E. 1966. "Persistence of the Open Syllable in Defective Articulation", Journal of Speech and Hearing Disorders 31. 370–373 
Calnan, J. and Renfrew, C. E. 1960–1961. "Blowing tests and speech", British Journal of Plastic Surgery 13. 340–346.

References

2002 deaths
British women academics
Speech and language pathologists
Fellows of the Royal College of Speech and Language Therapists
Members of the Order of the British Empire